A Gun That Shoots Knives is an independent music band which composes, performs, and records pop music. It is based in Seattle.

History
The band was formed in 2004 conducting avant-garde music and costume performances.

Reviews
The music of A Gun That Shoots Knives has been described as unorthodox, amusing, synthpop oddities.

References

External links

2008 interview in the Stranger
Sound on the Sound - "AGTSK" Search Results

Indie pop groups from Washington (state)
Musical groups established in 2004
Musical groups from Seattle
Musical groups from Washington (state)